Rumiko is a feminine Japanese given name. Notable people with the name include:

Rumiko Fujikawa, fictional character appearing in American comic books published by Marvel Comics who first appeared in The Invincible Iron Man in 1998
Rumiko Koyanagi (born 1952), Japanese actress and singer
Rumiko Takahashi (born 1957), Japanese manga artist
Rumiko Tani (born 1979), Korean-Japanese television personality
Rumiko Ukai (born 1955), Japanese voice actress 

Japanese feminine given names